Below a list of all National Champions in the Women's Pole Vault (outdoor) in track and field from several countries since the mid-1990s.

Argentina

1994: Mariana Falcioni
1995: Alejandra García
1996: Alejandra García
1997: Alejandra García
1998: Alejandra García
1999: Alejandra García
2000: Alejandra García
2001: Alejandra García
2002: Alejandra García
2003: Alejandra García
2004: Alejandra García
2005: Alejandra García
2006: Carolina Dalurzo

Australia

1995: Emma George
1996: Melissa Harris
1997: Emma George
1998: Emma George
1999: Tatiana Grigorieva
2000: Emma George
2001: Jenni Dryburgh (NZL)
2002: Tatiana Grigorieva
2003: Melina Hamilton (NZL)
2004: Kym Howe
2005: Melina Hamilton (NZL)
2006: Tatiana Grigorieva
2007: Kym Howe
2008: Alana Boyd
2009: Alana Boyd
2010: Elizabeth Parnov
2011: Charmaine Lucock
2012: Vicky Parnov
2013: Alana Boyd
2014: Liz Parnov
2015: Alana Boyd

Austria

1995: Monika Erlach
1996: Doris Auer
1997: Doris Auer
1998: Monika Erlach
1999: Doris Auer
2000: Doris Auer
2001: Michaela Kohlbauer
2002: Carmen Klausbruckner
2003: Carmen Klausbruckner
2004: Brigitta Pöll
2005: Doris Auer
2006: Carmen Klausbruckner

Belgium

1995: Sophie Zubiolo
1996: Sophie Zubiolo
1997: Sophie Zubiolo
1998: Sophie Zubiolo
1999: Irena Dufour
2000: Liesbet Van Roie
2001: Caroline Goetghebuer
2002: Irena Dufour
2003: Karen Pollefeyt
2004: Irena Dufour
2005: Irena Dufour
2006: Karen Pollefeyt
2007: Karen Pollefeyt
2008: Fanny Smets
2009: Fanny Smets
2010: Fanny Smets
2011: Fanny Smets
2012: Chloé Henry
2013: Fanny Smets
2014: Chloé Henry
2015: Chloé Henry
2016: Fanny Smets

Brazil

1995: Conceição Geremias
1996: Márcia Hennemann
1997: Miriam Schwuchow
1998: Patrícia Jiacomussi
1999: Joana Costa
2000: Karla da Silva
2001: Fabiana Murer
2002: Karla da Silva
2003: Karla da Silva
2004: Joana Costa
2005: Fabiana Murer
2006: Fabiana Murer
2007: Fabiana Murer
2008: Fabiana Murer
2009: Fabiana Murer
2010: Fabiana Murer
2011: Karla da Silva
2012: Karla da Silva
2013: Fabiana Murer
2014: Patrícia Gabriela dos Santos
2015: Fabiana Murer

Bulgaria

1995: Tanya Koleva
1996: Not Held
1997: Tanya Koleva
1998: Iva Vasileva
1999: Vera Chavdarova
2000: Tanya Koleva
2001: Vera Chavdarova
2002: Vera Chavdarova
2003: Vera Chavdarova
2004: Vera Chavdarova
2005: Tanya Stefanova
2006: Vera Chavdarova

Canada

1995: Rebecca Chambers
1996: Jackie Honey
1997: Trista Bernier
1998: Trista Bernier
1999: Rebecca Chambers
2000: Ardin Harrison
2001: Stephanie McCann
2002: Stephanie McCann
2003: Stephanie McCann
2004: Dana Ellis
2005: Dana Ellis
2006: Stephanie McCann
2007: Kelsie Hendry
2008: Kelsie Hendry
2010: Gabrielle Duclos-Lasnier
2011: Carly Dockendorf
2012: Lindsey Bergevin
2013: Heather Hamilton
2014: Lindsey Bergevin
2015: Kelsie Ahbe

China

1989: Wu Weili
1990: Zhang Chunzhen
1991: Zhang Chunzhen
1992: Sun Caiyun
1993: Sun Caiyun
1994: Cai Weiyan
1995: Zhong Guiqing
1996: Sun Caiyun
1997: Cai Weiyan
1998: Cai Weiyan
1999: Sun Caiyun
2000: Gao Shuying
2001: Gao Shuying
2002: Gao Shuying
2003: Zhao Yingying
2004: Gao Shuying
2005: Zhao Yingying

Czech Republic

1993: Daniela Bártová
1994: Daniela Bártová
1995: Daniela Bártová
1996: Daniela Bártová
1997: Daniela Bártová
1998: Daniela Bártová
1999: Pavla Hamácková
2000: Daniela Bártová
2001: Katerina Badurová
2002: Šárka Mládková
2003: Pavla Hamácková
2004: Katerina Badurová
2005: Pavla Hamácková
2006: Pavla Hamácková

Denmark

1996: Marie Bagger Rasmussen
1997: Louise Brændstrup
1998: Marie Bagger Rasmussen
1999: Karen Klintø
2000: Anita Tørring
2001: Marie Bagger Rasmussen
2002: Marie Bagger Bohn (Rasmussen)
2003: Anita Tørring
2004: Anita Tørring
2005: Anita Tørring
2006: Iben Høgh-Pedersen
2007: Anita Tørring

Estonia

1997: Margit Randver
1998: Merle Kivimets
1999: Margit Randver
2000: Merle Kivimets
2001: Margit Randver
2002: Margit Randver
2003: Kristin Karu
2004: Lea Saapar
2005: Kristina Ulitina
2006: Kristina Ulitina
2007: Lembi Vaher
2008: Lembi Vaher
2009: Lembi Vaher
2010: Lembi Vaher
2011: Reena Koll
2012: Lembi Vaher
2013: Lembi Vaher
2014: Reena Koll
2015: Reena Koll
2016: Getter Marie Lemberg
2017: Lembi Vaher
2018: Reena Koll
2019: Marleen Mülla
2020: Marleen Mülla
2021: Marleen Mülla
2022: Marleen Mülla

Finland

1994: Birgitta Ivanoff
1995: Teija Saari
1996: Tiina Vilenius
1997: Teija Saari
1998: Teija Saari
1999: Teija Saari
2000: Annu Mäkelä
2001: Teija Saari
2002: Teija Saari
2003: Hanna Palamaa
2004: Saara Laaksonen
2005: Aino-Maija Karvinen
2006: Minna Nikkanen
2007: Minna Nikkanen
2008: Vanessa Vandy
2009: Minna Nikkanen
2010: Minna Nikkanen
2011: Minna Nikkanen
2012: Minna Nikkanen
2013: Minna Nikkanen
2014: Minna Nikkanen

France

1995: Caroline Ammel
1996: Amandine Homo
1997: Aurore Pignot
1998: Amandine Homo
1999: Amandine Homo
2000: Caroline Ammel
2001: Vanessa Boslak
2002: Marie Poissonnier
2003: Vanessa Boslak
2004: Vanessa Boslak
2005: Vanessa Boslak
2006: Elisabete Tavares (POR)
2007: Vanessa Boslak
2008: Marion Buisson
2009: Sandra Ribeiro-Tavares

Germany

1992: Daniela Köpernick
1993: Carmen Haage
1994: Andrea Müller
1995: Christine Adams
1996: Christine Adams
1997: Andrea Müller
1998: Sabine Schulte
1999: Yvonne Buschbaum
2000: Yvonne Buschbaum
2001: Annika Becker
2002: Annika Becker
2003: Yvonne Buschbaum
2004: Carolin Hingst
2005: Silke Spiegelburg
2006: Silke Spiegelburg
2007: Silke Spiegelburg
2008: Carolin Hingst
2009: Silke Spiegelburg
2010: Silke Spiegelburg
2011: Martina Strutz
2012: Silke Spiegelburg
2013: Martina Strutz
2014: Lisa Ryzih
2015: Lisa Ryzih

Greece

1995: Georgia Tsiligiri
1996: Paraskevi Koumbou
1997: Georgia Tsiligiri
1998: Georgia Tsiligiri
1999: Thaleia Iakovidou
2000: Georgia Tsiligiri
2001: Georgia Tsiligiri
2002: Georgia Tsiligiri
2003: Anna Fitidou (CYP)
2004: Georgia Tsiligiri
2005: Afroditi Skafida
2006: Antigoni Asteriou

Hungary

1995: Zsuzsanna Szabó
1996: Zsuzsanna Szabó
1997: Eszter Szemerédi
1998: Zsuzsanna Szabó
1999: Zsuzsanna Szabó
2000: Zsuzsanna Szabó
2001: Krisztina Molnár
2002: Krisztina Molnár
2003: Zsuzsanna Szabó
2004: Krisztina Molnár
2005: Krisztina Molnár
2006: Krisztina Molnár

Italy

1995: Maria Carla Bresciani
1996: Chiara Romana
1997: Maria Carla Bresciani
1998: Anna Tamburuni
1999: Maria Carla Bresciani
2000: Arianna Farfaletti Casali
2001: Maria Carla Bresciani
2002: Francesca Dolcini
2003: Arianna Farfaletti Casali
2004: Maria Carla Bresciani
2005: Sara Bruzzese
2006: Arianna Farfaletti Casali
2007: Anna Giordano Bruno
2008: Anna Giordano Bruno
2009: Anna Giordano Bruno
2010: Elena Scarpellini 
2011: Anna Giordano Bruno
2012: Anna Giordano Bruno
2013: Giorgia Benecchi
2014: Roberta Bruni 
2015: Sonia Malavisi 
2016: Sonia Malavisi 
2017: Elisa Molinarolo 
2018: Roberta Bruni

Japan

1995: Yayoi Suzuki
1996: Mami Nakano
1997: Mami Nakano
1998: Masumi Ono
1999: Masumi Ono
2000: Akane Eguchi
2001: Takayo Kondo
2002: Takayo Kondo
2003: Masumi Ono
2004: Takayo Kondo
2005: Takayo Kondo
2006: Mami Nakano
2007: Takayo Kondo
2008: Tomomi Abiko
2009: Takayo Kondo
2010: Tomomi Abiko
2011: Tomomi Abiko
2012: Tomomi Abiko
2013: Tatsuta Kanae
2014: Megumi Hamana
2015: Tatsuta Kanae
2016: Ayako Aoshima
2017: Tomomi Abiko
2018: Juri Nanbu
2019: Mayu Nasu

Latvia

1996: Elīna Ringa (2,80m)
1997: Elīna Ringa
1998: Elīna Ringa
1999: Elīna Ringa
2000: Elīna Ringa (3,70m)
2001: Elīna Ringa
2002: Irēna Žauna
2003: Elīna Ringa
2004: Rita Obižajeva
2005: Alise Dimante
2006: Elīna Ringa
2007: Elīna Ringa
2008: Elīna Ringa
2009: Ildze Bortašķenoka
2010: Ildze Bortašķenoka

Netherlands

1995: Marjolein Masclee
1996: Monique de Wilt
1997: Monique de Wilt
1998: Monique de Wilt
1999: Monique de Wilt
2000: Monique de Wilt
2001: Monique de Wilt
2002: Sandra van der Geer
2003: Sandra van der Geer
2004: Monique de Wilt
2005: Rianna Galiart
2006: Rianna Galiart
2007: Rianna Galiart
2008: Rianna Galiart
2009: Rianna Galiart
2010: Denise Groot
2011: Denise Groot
2012: Rianna Galiart
2013: Rianna Galiart
2014: Rianna Galiart
2015: Femke Pluim
2016: Femke Pluim

New Zealand

1992: Melina Hamilton
1993: Melina Hamilton
1994: Melina Hamilton
1995: Emily Marshall
1996: Cassandra Kelly
1997: Melina Hamilton
1998: Jenni Dryburgh
1999: Melina Hamilton
2000: Melina Hamilton
2001: Jenni Dryburgh
2002: Melina Hamilton
2003: Melina Hamilton
2004: Melina Hamilton
2005: Melina Hamilton
2006: Melina Hamilton
2007: Melina Hamilton
2008: Melina Hamilton
2009: Julia Hart
2010: Julia Hart
2011: Kerry Charlesworth
2012: Lucy McGall
2013: Valerie Chan
2014: Kerry Charlesworth
2015: Eliza McCartney
2016: Eliza McCartney

Poland

1995: Anna Skrzyńska
1996: Anna Wielgus
1997: Anna Wielgus
1998: Anna Wielgus
1999: Monika Pyrek
2000: Monika Pyrek
2001: Monika Pyrek
2002: Monika Pyrek
2003: Agnieszka Wrona
2004: Monika Pyrek
2005: Monika Pyrek
2006: Monika Pyrek
2007: Monika Pyrek
2008: Monika Pyrek
2009: Anna Rogowska
2010: Monika Pyrek
2011: Anna Rogowska
2012: Monika Pyrek
2013: Anna Rogowska
2014: Anna Rogowska
2015: Justyna Śmietanka
2016: Justyna Śmietanka
2017: Justyna Śmietanka
2018: Justyna Śmietanka
2019: Kamila Przybyła

Portugal

1995: Sónia Machado
1996: Cristina Santos Almeida
1997: Ana Marisa Vieira
1998: Tânia Costa
1999: Ana Marisa Vieira
2000: Ana Marisa Vieira
2001: Elisabete Tavares
2002: Sandra Helena Tavares
2003: Elisabete Tavares
2004: Elisabete Tavares
2005: Elisabete Tavares
2006: Elisabete Tavares
2007: Sandra Helena Tavares
2008: Sandra Helena Tavares
2009: Maria Leonor Tavares
2010: Sandra Helena Tavares
2011: Maria Leonor Tavares
2012: Maria Leonor Tavares

Russia

1993: Svetlana Abramova
1994: Svetlana Abramova
1995: Marina Andreyeva
1996: Marina Andreyeva
1997: Svetlana Abramova
1998: Yelena Belyakova
1999: Yelena Belyakova
2000: Yelena Belyakova
2001: Svetlana Feofanova
2002: Yelena Isinbayeva
2003: Yelena Belyakova
2004: Anastasiya Ivanova
2005: Tatyana Polnova
2006: Svetlana Feofanova
2007: Svetlana Feofanova
2008: Svetlana Feofanova
2009: Yuliya Golubchikova
2010: Yuliya Golubchikova

South Africa

1995: Elmarie Gerryts
1996: Elmarie Gerryts
1997: Elmarie Gerryts
1998: Elmarie Gerryts
1999: Elmarie Gerryts
2000: Elmarie Gerryts
2001: Elmarie Gerryts
2002: Annelie van Wyk
2003: Samantha Dodd
2004: Samantha Dodd
2005: Lindi Roux
2006: Samantha Dodd

Spain

1995: Dana Cervantes
1996: Naiara Larrea
1997: Esther Auyanet
1998: Mar Sánchez
1999: Dana Cervantes
2000: Mar Sánchez
2001: Mar Sánchez
2002: Dana Cervantes
2003: Naroa Agirre
2004: Dana Cervantes
2005: Mar Sánchez
2006: Naroa Agirre
2007: Naroa Agirre
2008: Naroa Agirre
2009: Naroa Agirre
2010: Naroa Agirre
2011: Ana María Pinero
2012: Ana María Pinero

Sweden

1996: Alissa White
1997: Alissa White
1998: Charlotte Karlsson
1999: Hanna-Mia Persson
2000: Malin Ericsson
2001: Kirsten Belin
2002: Kirsten Belin
2003: Linda Persson
2004: Linda Persson
2005: Hanna-Mia Persson
2006: Linda Persson

Ukraine 

1992: not contested
1993: not contested
1994: not contested
1995: not contested
1996: Anzhela Balakhonova
1997: Anzhela Balakhonova
1998: Lyudmyla Prykhodko
1999: Anzhela Balakhonova
2000: Anzhela Balakhonova
2001: Anzhela Balakhonova
2002: Yevgeniya Katkova
2003: Natalya Kushch
2004: Anzhela Balakhonova
2005: Anzhela Balakhonova
2006: Alevtina Ruyeva
2007: Natalya Mazuryk
2008: Natalya Mazuryk
2009: Alevtina Ruyeva
2010: Oksana Petrenko
2011: Kseniya Chertkoshvili
2012: Natalya Mazuryk
2013: Kateryna Kozlova
2014: Hanna Shelekh
2015: Maryna Kylypko
2016: Maryna Kylypko
2017: Maryna Kylypko
2018: Maryna Kylypko
2019: Maryna Kylypko
2020: Maryna Kylypko

United States

1994: Melissa Price
1995: Melissa Price
1996: Stacy Dragila
1997: Stacy Dragila
1998: Kellie Suttle
1999: Stacy Dragila
2000: Stacy Dragila
2001: Stacy Dragila
2002: Stacy Dragila
2003: Stacy Dragila
2004: Stacy Dragila
2005: Stacy Dragila
2006: Jennifer Stuczynski
2007: Jennifer Stuczynski
2008: Jennifer Stuczynski
2009: Jennifer Stuczynski
2010: Jenn Suhr
2011: Kylie Hutson
2012: Jenn Suhr
2013: Jenn Suhr
2014: Jenn Suhr
2015: Jenn Suhr
2016: Jenn Suhr
2017: Sandi Morris
2018: Sandi Morris
2019: Sandi Morris

See also
 List of pole vault national champions (men)

Notes

References
 GBRathletics

Women
Pole vault, national champions
National